Julius Ferdinand Blüthner (11 March 1824 - 13 April 1910) was a German piano maker and founder of the Blüthner piano factory.

Biography 
Blüthner was born in Falkenhain (now Meuselwitz), Thuringia.  In 1853 he founded a piano-manufacturing company in Leipzig Germany. Blüthner pianos had an early success at exhibitions, conservatories and the concert stage. Further inventions and innovations lead Blüthner to patent a repetition action, and, in 1873, the aliquot scaling patent for grand pianos. This added a fourth, sympathetic (aliquot) string to each trichord group in the treble to enrich the piano's weakest register by enhancing the overtone spectrum of the instrument.  He died, aged 86, in Leipzig.

External links

Company homepage of Blüthner
German Piano Imports
Bluthner Pianos London

1824 births
1910 deaths
People from Meuselwitz
Piano makers